Dr. Amir Hossein Sadaghiani (1 January 1903 – 1 December 1982) was an Iranian football player and manager. He was a striker during his playing career and afterwards was Iran national football team's head coach from 1941 till 1950.

Playing career

Club career
Dr. Sadaghiani is the first ever Iranian soccer player to play abroad in a European league. He played for youth teams of Fenerbahçe and Rapid Wien then returned to Iran and established Ferdowsi Club in Mashhad, but his stay was short as he returned to Tehran a year later.

At 26, he moved Europe to study in Belgium. He arrived at the Université du travail de Charleroi in 1929. He joined CS Marchienne-Monceau, a provincial second division team. He proved to be a very gifted player so he made his mark in Belgium's second Division (1930-1932) and third division (1932-1933) playing for R. Charleroi S.C. for two successful seasons.

In the 1930s, his premature baldness earned him the nickname of "Panne de verre", a walloon folklore expression used for bald people.

After Charleroi, he moved to Turkey for a year with Fenerbahçe then back to Belgium after 1,5 year where he played in Division III back by Charleroi SC and lower level. In 1936 he left Belgium and finished his football career with Toofan in Tehran.

National career
Although Sadaghiani never played for the Iranian national team as it was not created until 1941, he has 4 caps to his name when in 1926 he played for a Tehran XI team that traveled to Baku, USSR. Tehran XI lost three games and drew one.

Managerial career
 Head Coach of Iran national football team 1941–1950
 Head Coach of the University of Tehran's Soccer Team 1945–1964

References

Irankick Forum Article
Aftab Magazine
Aftab Magazine
گزارشى از زندگى اولین لژیونر فوتبال ایران

اولین آقای گل ایرانی در اروپا کیست؟

1903 births
1982 deaths
Fenerbahçe S.K. footballers
SK Rapid Wien players
R. Olympic Charleroi Châtelet Farciennes players
R. Charleroi S.C. players
R.R.C. Peruwelz players
Iran national football team managers
Iranian expatriate footballers
Iranian football managers
Iranian footballers
Sportspeople from Tabriz
Expatriate footballers in Austria
Expatriate footballers in Belgium
Expatriate footballers in Turkey
Iranian expatriate sportspeople in Turkey
Association football forwards